is the name of several places in Japan. 

The name means capital of a province (Kokufu). According to the provisions of the 8th-century Ritsuryō system, there was a fuchū in every administrative province. The placename Fuchū remains in many areas of Japan.

In order to avoid confusion and mistakes, Japan tries to prevent its cities (shi) from sharing names written with the same kanji. The name  (Fuchū), shared by the cities Fuchū, Hiroshima and Fuchū, Tokyo, is one of only two exceptions (the other being Date, Hokkaidō and Date, Fukushima).

Current settlements
Fuchū, Tokyo, a city in Tokyo
Fuchū, Hiroshima, a city in Hiroshima Prefecture
Fuchū, Hiroshima (town), a town in Hiroshima Prefecture
 , a former town (1889–2005) in Toyama Prefecture, Japan, which is now a district in Toyama City

Historical entities
 Tsushima-Fuchū Domain, whose centre was in what is now Nagasaki prefecture
 Hitachi-Fuchū Domain, whose centre was in what is now Ibaraki prefecture
 Sunpu Domain, for three decades named Suruga-Fuchū Domain, whose centre was in what is now Shizuoka prefecture
Fuchū-shuku, a former post station on the Tōkaidō
Fuchū-shuku, a former post station on the Kōshū Kaidō

Stations
 Fuchū Station (Hiroshima)
 Fuchū Station (Tokyo)
 Fuchūhommachi Station (in Fuchū, Tokyo)
 Fuchūkeiba-seimommae Station (in Fuchū, Tokyo)

Other
 Fuchū Prison (in Fuchū, Tokyo)
 Fuchū Air Base (Tokyo)
 Fuchū-no-Mori Park (in Fuchū, Tokyo)

See also
Ichinomiya
Kokubunji

Notes